Joan Cross defeated Doris Schuster in the final, 6–1, 6–1 to win the girls' singles tennis title at the 1959 Wimbledon Championships.

Draw

Draw

References

External links

Girls' Singles
Wimbledon Championship by year – Girls' singles
Wimbledon Championships
Wimbledon Championships